Euxesta compta is a species of ulidiid or picture-winged fly in the genus Euxesta of the family Ulidiidae.

References

compta
Insects described in 1912